Pseudalsophis is a genus of snakes in the family Colubridae. The genus is endemic to South America.

Geographic range
Species in the genus Pseudalsophis are found in Ecuador (particularly the Galápagos) and Peru.

Species
Seven species are recognized as being valid.
Pseudalsophis biserialis  – Galápagos racer, Floreana snake, Española snake, San Cristóbal snake
Pseudalsophis darwini 
Pseudalsophis dorsalis  – Galápagos snake, Fernandina snake, Isabela snake
Pseudalsophis elegans 
Pseudalsophis hephaestus 
Pseudalsophis hoodensis  – Hood Island snake
Pseudalsophis occidentalis 
Pseudalsophis slevini  – banded Galápagos snake, Slevin's snake, 
Pseudalsophis steindachneri  – striped Galápagos snake, Steindachner's snake
Pseudalsophis thomasi 

Nota bene: A binomial authority in parentheses indicates that the species was originally described in a genus other than Pseudalsophis.

Etymology
The specific names, slevini and steidachneri, are in honor of American herpetologist Joseph Richard Slevin and Austrian herpetologist Franz Steindachner, respectively.

References

Further reading
Zaher, Hussam; Grazziotin, Felipe Gobbi; Cadle, John E.; Murphy, Robert W.; de Moura-Leite, Julio Cesar; Bonatto, Sandro (2009). "Molecular phylogeny of advanced snakes (Serpentes, Caenophidia) with an emphasis on South American Xenodontines: a revised classification and descriptions of new taxa". Papéis Avulsos de Zoologia 49 (11): 115–153. (Pseudalsophis, new genus). (in English, with abstracts in English and Portuguese).

Colubrids